F/A-18E Super Hornet is a 1999 video game from Titus Interactive. The game was released in the United Kingdom in November 1999 and in North America in 2000. It simulates the F/A-18E Super Hornet fighter aircraft.

Reception
{{Video game reviews
|rev1=Computer Gaming World
|rev1Score=3/5
|rev2=GameSpot
|rev2Score=6.4/10
|rev3=Eurogamer
|rev3Score=7/10
|rev4=PC Joker|rev4Score=72%
|rev5=PC PowerPlay|rev5Score=63%
|rev6=PC Player|rev6Score=66%
}}

Tom Basham from Computer Gaming World'' gave the game a score of 3 out of 5, stating: "Timing may be SUPER HORNET’s worst enemy, having arrived after JANE’S F/A-18. Although definitely a solid sim, it’s somewhat eclipsed by Jane’s representation of the F/A-18E, especially regarding the carrier landings, HARM missile operation, wingmen, and bad weather."

References

1999 video games
Combat flight simulators
Titus Software games
Video games developed in the United Kingdom
Windows games
Windows-only games